Wallichia was a genus of seven species of flowering plant in the family Arecaceae. Its species are now included within the genus Arenga.

Species
The genus is distributed in the Eastern Himalayas, northern Indochina, and southern China.

References

 
Arecaceae genera
Flora of tropical Asia
Taxonomy articles created by Polbot